Matela is a village in Bajhang District in the Seti Zone of north-western Nepal.

References

Populated places in Bajhang District